Ma Mya Ching is a Bangladeshi politician from Bandarban belonging to Bangladesh Nationalist Party. She is a former member of the Jatiya Sangsad.

Biography
Ching is Aung Shwe Prue Chowdhury's co-sister-in-law and she is Saching Prue Jerry's aunt. She was elected as a member of the Jatiya Sangsad from Reserved Women's Seat-30 in the Fifth Jatiya Sangsad Election. She was also elected as a member of the Jatiya Sangsad from Reserved Women's Seat-30 in the Sixth General Election of Bangladesh.

References

Living people
People from Bandarban District
5th Jatiya Sangsad members
6th Jatiya Sangsad members
Bangladesh Nationalist Party politicians
Women members of the Jatiya Sangsad
Marma people
Bangladeshi Buddhists
Year of birth missing (living people)